Parc Festyland is a relatively small theme park situated within the Caen ringroad (A13/A84) in Lower Normandy, France. Sometimes referred to as being in Carpiquet in Greater Caen, the theme park receives approximately 110,000 visitors a year.

Background

Parc Festyland is a true theme park as it has a central unifying theme in accordance with which the whole park - from rides to restaurants to surroundings - is built. The theme of Parc Festyland 
is the 1066 era. Being a family theme park, it concentrates on the architecture and personalities of the time. The park's logo is a friendly, young-looking dragon's head sporting a Viking hat and a large grin.

Visiting Figures
In 2005, the park received 110,000 visitors, compared to Caen's five museums which received 550,000 visitors between them (source: Caen tourist office).

Advertising
Parc Festyland runs an advertising campaign in association with the Caen tourist office. In all language versions of the booklet, the first inner page is a full colour advert for the park. It consists of the Parc Festyland name and logo, the catchphrase ("defiez le!!!"), contact details (website address and phone number), and two pictures of females appearing to enjoy themselves at the park, with a large rollercoaster in the background.

Catchphrase
The park's motto is Défiez le!. The English version of the Caen tourist office booklet translates this phrase as 'brave it'. It refers to braving the main attraction (a 59 second long roller coaster).

Features

Rides in the Park 
The Drakkar Express is a steel roller coaster, the cars of which are designed to resemble Viking ships.
The bumper boats are waterborne dodgem cars. The cars seat either one person, or an adult and a small child, however height restrictions do apply. Each car consists of a plastic moulded steering platform supported by an inflated rubber cushion.

The bateaux les pentes vertigineuses du Piratak are a water slide with boats.

Prehistyland 
A section of the park is themed to the prehistoric era, instead of 1066 as is the rest of the park. The prehistoric area includes life size models of dinosaurs and a rope bridge traversing a lake.

Floral Decorations 
There are gardens with floral decorations and snail-shaped vehicles on a fixed tracks that take visitors on tours.

External links 
 Park's website

Amusement parks in France
Buildings and structures in Caen
Tourist attractions in Normandy
Amusement parks opened in 1989
1989 establishments in France